HM or hm may refer to:

Arts and entertainment
 HM (magazine), a Christian hard rock magazine
 Hidden Machine, a type of item in Pokémon

Businesses
 H&M, a Swedish clothing company
 Hindustan Motors, an automobile manufacturer of India
 Air Seychelles (IATA airline code)

Other uses
 Heard Island and McDonald Islands (ISO 3166 digram and FIPS PUB 10-4 territory code)
 .hm, the Internet country code top-level domain ostensibly for the above
 Hectometre, hm, an SI unit of length
 Henry Molaison, aka Patient H.M., a man with anterograde amnesia
 His or Her Majesty, a form of address for various monarchs
 Hindley–Milner type system, in mathematics
 Hospital corpsman, in the United States Navy
 Sisters of the Holy Humility of Mary's postnominal initials